Shrink art, Shrinky Dinks, or Shrinkles is a toy and activity kit consisting of sheets of polystyrene which can be cut with standard household scissors. When heated, the cut shapes become about nine times thicker while their horizontal and vertical dimensions reduce to about one-third the original size, resulting in hard, flat forms which retain their initial color and shape.  They reached the height of their popularity in the 1980s and are still available from retailers. They can be used for a variety of things like charms and pins.  Most sets are pre-printed with outline images of popular children's characters or other subjects, which are then colored in before baking.

History 
Shrinky Dinks were invented in 1973 by Betty Morris and Kate Bloomberg, two housewives in Brookfield, Wisconsin, as a Cub Scout project with their sons. The first kits were sold at a local shopping mall and became very popular. Shrinky Dinks were soon licensed to be manufactured by the major toy companies of the time such as Milton Bradley, Colorforms, Western Publishing and Skyline Toys.

As of 2020, the original brand Shrinky Dinks is owned by Just Play Products.

Usage 
The base material consists of thin, flexible polystyrene plastic (#6) sheets. Prior to heating, the plastic sheets can be colored with felt-tip pens, acrylic paint, colored pencils, etc. and cut into shapes.  However, oily or waxy substances (such as cheap colored pencils, crayons or oil paint) are not suitable because they melt or burn in high heat. When heated with the Easy-Bake Oven, a conventional oven, or a heat gun, the plastic shrinks and becomes thicker and more rigid, while retaining the colored design.

Although Shrinky Dinks are primarily an arts and crafts product marketed for children, adult crafters and artists also use the product for jewelry making and other projects. Blank sheets are available in bulk for this purpose.

Applications 

In 2008, University of California, Irvine Professor Michelle Khine applied Shrinky Dinks to create tiny structures for the application of microfluidics to topics such as stem cell research.  In 2022, Michelle Khine researched the use of Shrinky Dinks for microscale diagnostics and wearable biosensors for monitoring health.

In 2009, an art therapy supervision class at Emporia State University explored the use of Shrinky Dinks in art therapy. In 2014, Shrinky Dinks were presented as an art therapy medium in a workshop at the American Art Therapy Association Conference.

In 2014, a team from Harvard University and MIT used Shrinky Dinks to create self-assembling robots.

In popular culture 

In 1992, the California rock band Sugar Ray formed with the name "Shrinky Dinx", but later changed it upon threat of lawsuit from the Milton Bradley Company.

References

External links

Shrinky-Dink microfluidics: rapid generation of deep and rounded patterns
A children’s toy inspires a cheap, easy production method for high-tech diagnostic chips
The Magical World of Shrinky Dinks

Art and craft toys
Products introduced in 1973
1970s toys
Goods manufactured in the United States